Olamide Oluwatimilehin Babatunde Oluwaka Shodipo (born 5 July 1997) is an Irish professional footballer who plays as a winger for  club Lincoln City, on loan from  club Queens Park Rangers.

He made his first-team debut for QPR in August 2016, and has been capped by the Republic of Ireland at under-19 and under-21 levels. He joined Port Vale on loan in January 2017, and joined Colchester United on loan in January 2018. He made 13 appearances for QPR during the 2019–20 season, though spent the following season on loan at Oxford United and was loaned out to Sheffield Wednesday for the 2021–22 campaign. He joined Lincoln City on loan for the second half of the 2022–23 season.

Club career

Queens Park Rangers
Shodipo was born in Leixlip, a town near Dublin, Ireland, before moving to London at the age of two. He signed a two-year contract extension with Queens Park Rangers in April 2016. He made his senior debut  in the opening game of the 2016–17 EFL Championship season on 7 August 2016, in a 3–0 win over Leeds United at Loftus Road; he was named in the starting lineup, and was later substituted in the 68th minute for Abdenasser El Khayati. Manager Jimmy Floyd Hasselbaink later said that Shodipo had "that rawness... that streetness and that fight" and said "we will definitely be putting him in and around the team regularly". On 30 November, Shodipo signed a new two-and-a-half-year contract with QPR, tying him to the club until 2019. However new manager Ian Holloway left him out of the team in favour of new signing Kazenga LuaLua, explaining his decision by saying "every time I've put him on, unfortunately the team has let a goal in"; Holloway said "he would benefit massively from a loan spell", which he hoped would improve the defensive and tactical side of his game.

On 30 January 2017, Shodipo signed with EFL League One side Port Vale on loan until the end of the 2016–17 season. He made six appearances for the "Valiants" before being ruled out for the rest of the season after picking up a tendinitis injury on international duty in March 2017.

On 31 January 2018, he joined EFL League Two side Colchester United on loan until the end of the 2017–18 season. He came off the bench to make his debut on 10 March in the "U's" 1–1 draw at Mansfield Town. However he was limited to just two starts and four substitute appearances by manager John McGreal during his time at the Colchester Community Stadium.

He suffered a significant tear to his thigh muscle in September 2018 and was ruled out of action for four months. He was praised by manager Steve McClaren upon his return to playing and featured four times for QPR during the 2018–19 season, before having his contract extended by a further 12 months in May 2019. Director of football Les Ferdinand said that "He's had a tough time with injuries in the last couple of years but hopefully that is behind him now and we are looking forward to seeing him out on the pitch next season." He was handed a new contract by new manager Mark Warburton in September 2019, keeping him at the club until summer 2022.

On 16 October 2020, he joined League One side Oxford United on loan for the 2020–21 season; manager Karl Robinson said that "he is an exciting player to watch, very unpredictable but always a threat because he has so much pace and a willingness to take people on". He came off the bench to score the winning goal on his debut for the "U's" three days later, in a 3–2 win over Milton Keynes Dons at the Kassam Stadium. He scored ten goals from 39 League One games, including one goal that helped to secure a play-off place on the final day of the campaign. He also scored against Blackpool in the play-off semi-finals, though Oxford lost 6–3 on aggregate.

On 11 July 2021, he signed for League One club Sheffield Wednesday on a season-long loan deal. On arriving at the club, Shodipo said that "the fans are immense and I’m looking forward to working with Darren Moore. I want to come and help the team as much as possible and aim for promotion". He would make his competitive debut for the "Owls" on 1 August, in an EFL Cup tie with Huddersfield Town at Hillsborough, however an injury would see him replaced in the first half. He would make his return from his injury against Huddersfield Town, coming off the bench on 11 September 2021, against Plymouth Argyle. He would score his first goal for the "Owls"  in a 2–2 home draw with Wycombe Wanderers on 27 November. However he picked up a long-term injury, reported to be hamstring related, the following month. Moore did not include Shodipo in the EFL squad list in January, though said that he could be re-added before the 24 March deadline. Shodipo did make two final substitute appearances in April to take his final total at Sheffield Wednesday to 21 appearances, including only seven league starts. With his contract at QPR expiring in summer 2022, he was reported to be in contract negotiations at Loftus Road.

On 14 January 2023, Shodipo joined League One side Lincoln City on loan for the remainder of the 2022–23 season, making his debut the same day against Milton Keynes Dons. He had made eleven Championship appearances for QPR in the first half of the campaign, before new manager Neil Critchley decided he was not in his first-team plans.

International career
Also eligible to play for Nigeria, Shodipo made his debut for the Republic of Ireland under-19 team in October 2015, and made his debut for the under-21 team in September 2016.

Style of play
Speaking in January 2017, Ian Holloway praised Shodipo's dribbling and crossing skills though said he had work to do to improve his defensive game.

Career statistics

References

1997 births
Living people
People from Leixlip
Sportspeople from County Kildare
Republic of Ireland association footballers
Republic of Ireland expatriate association footballers
Republic of Ireland under-21 international footballers
Association football wingers
Queens Park Rangers F.C. players
Port Vale F.C. players
Colchester United F.C. players
Oxford United F.C. players
Sheffield Wednesday F.C. players
Lincoln City F.C. players
English Football League players
Irish people of Nigerian descent
Irish expatriate sportspeople in England
Expatriate footballers in England
Black Irish sportspeople